Claude Kietzman (7 June 1918 – 18 August 1989) was a South African rower. He competed in the men's coxless four event at the 1948 Summer Olympics.

References

1918 births
1989 deaths
South African male rowers
Olympic rowers of South Africa
Rowers at the 1948 Summer Olympics
Place of birth missing
20th-century South African people